Andrew Lane is an American film producer and director. Together with Wayne Crawford he co-produced the 1983 comedy Valley Girl starring Nicolas Cage in his first co-starring role. The two were responsible for producing several other films including Night of the Comet, Servants of Twilight, Mortal Passions, and Jake Speed.

He is an assistant professor at Chapman University in Orange County.

Filmography
As director:
Jake Speed (1986)
Mortal Passions (1989)
Lonely Hearts (1991)
Distant Cousins (1993)
The Secretary (TV film) (1995)
Trade-Off (TV film) (1995)
Train Wreck (2008)

As producer:
God's Bloody Acre (1975)
Tomcats (1977)
Valley Girl (1983)
Night of the Comet (1984)
Jake Speed (1986)
Peacemaker (1990)
Femme Fatale (1991)
Lonely Hearts (1991)
Trade Off (TV film) (1995)
South of Hell (2005)
Bad Girls from Valley High (2005)

As writer:
Tomcats (1977)
Valley Girl (1983)
Jake Speed (1986)
Lonely Hearts (1991)
South of Hell (2005)
Bad Girls from Valley High (2005)

References

Living people
American film producers
Chapman University faculty
Year of birth missing (living people)